G.S. Peristeri (Greek: Γ.Σ. Περιστερίου), full name, Gymnastikos Syllogos Peristeri (Greek: Γυμναστικός Σύλλογος Περιστερίου), is a Greek multi-sport club that is located in Peristeri, Athens, Greece. The club was founded on October 22, 1971. The club's emblem is the dove symbol, and the club's colors are yellow and blue.

The club has the following athletic departments: men's basketball, women's basketball, men's water polo, women's water polo, swimming, and synchronised swimming.

Departments 
Peristeri B.C. - men's basketball
Peristeri (women's basketball) - women's basketball
Peristeri Water Polo Club - men's water polo
Peristeri (women's water polo) - women's water polo
Peristeri (swimming club) - swimming, synchronised swimming

Logos

Men's basketball
Peristeri B.C. was founded in 1971.

Women's basketball
Peristeri (women's basketball) was founded in 1995.

References

External links
Official Club Website 
Club Facilities 

 
Multi-sport clubs in Athens
Athletics clubs in Greece